Derek Wirth (born 29 November 1978) is a former Australian rules footballer who played with the Brisbane Lions in the Australian Football League (AFL).

A Springwood junior, Wirth was a key position player, originally drafted to the Brisbane Bears. He was recruited from Mount Gravatt, as one of three zone selections in the 1995 AFL Draft. He didn't play a league game for Brisbane in 1996 and at the end of the year was signed by the Lions, who were formed from a merger between the Bears and Fitzroy.

He spent two years with the Lions and in his second season finally made his debut, against Melbourne at the MCG in round 18. Wirth kicked two goals and was one of just two multiple goal-scorers from Brisbane, but lost his place in the side following a 95-point loss. It was the only AFL game he would play, despite also spending a year at Geelong, who had picked him up in the rookie draft.

In 2000 he was a member of the Redland team which competed in their inaugural Queensland State League season. He went on to make over 100 appearances with the club and served as captain from 2003 to 2005.

References

1978 births
Australian rules footballers from Queensland
Brisbane Lions players
Mount Gravatt Football Club players
Redland Football Club players
Living people